John Orlando (born 15 October 1960) is a Nigerian former footballer who played for the Nigeria national football team as a defender. He won the 1980 African Cup of Nations tournament while representing Nigeria and also represented Nigeria at the 1980 Summer Olympics in Russia.

Honours

International
 Africa Cup of Nations – 1980

References

External links
 

1960 births
Living people
Shooting Stars S.C. players
1980 African Cup of Nations players
Africa Cup of Nations-winning players
Nigerian footballers
Olympic footballers of Nigeria
Footballers at the 1980 Summer Olympics
Association football defenders